SPL may refer to:

Association football
 Saudi Professional League
 Scottish Premier League
 SportPesa Premier League, Kenya
 Singapore Premier League
 RoboCup Standard Platform League, matches between autonomous robots

Computing

Programming languages
 System programming language
 Shakespeare Programming Language
 Space Programming Language, influenced by JOVIAL

Other uses in computing
 Spl (Unix) functions to set priority level
 Secondary Program Loader
 Software product line
 Standard PHP Library, used in PHP5 onwards
 Sun Public License, Sun Microsystems
 RoboCup Standard Platform League, autonomous robot association football matches

Businesses and organisations

Political
 Sammarineses for Freedom, Italian: Sammarinesi per la Libertà, a political party in San Marino
 Socialist Party of Latvia, formed in 1994
 Secular Pro-Life, in the United States

Other businesses and organisations
 Finnish Wood Workers' Union, a former trade union
 Service de police de Longueuil, the police department of Longueuil, Quebec
 Saudi Post (SPL), logistics company

Places
 Amsterdam Airport Schiphol, Netherlands (by former IATA code)
 Scottish Poetry Library, Edinburgh, Scotland

Science and medicine
 Scanning probe lithography, a direct contact method of lithography
 Sound pressure level, a measure of sound pressure
 Spore photoproduct lyase, an enzyme
 Stretched penile length, measuring Human penis size
 Structured Product Labeling of prescription drug
 Superior parietal lobule

Other uses
 Senior Patrol Leader, voluntary rôle in the Boy Scouts of America or Baden-Powell Scouts' Association
 SPL: Sha Po Lang, 2005 Hong Kong action film